The Bangladesh Mathematical Olympiad is an annual mathematical competition arranged for school and college students to nourish their interest and capabilities for mathematics. It has been regularly organized by the Bangladesh Math Olympiad Committee since 2001. Bangladesh Math Olympiad activities started in 2003 formally. The first Math Olympiad was held in Shahjalal University of Science and Technology. Mohammad Kaykobad, Muhammad Zafar Iqbal and Munir Hasan were instrumental in its establishment.

With the endeavor of the members of the committee, the daily newspaper Prothom Alo and the Dutch Bangla Bank Limited, the committee promptly achieved its primary goal – to send a team to the International Mathematical Olympiad. Bangladeshi students have participated in the International Mathematical Olympiad since 2005.

Besides arranging Divisional and National Math Olympiads, the committee extends its cooperation to all interested groups and individuals who want to arrange a Mathematics Olympiad. The Bangladesh Math Olympiad and the selection of the Bangladeshi national team for the International Mathematical Olympiad is bounded by rules set by the Olympiad Committee. The Bangladesh Mathematical Olympiad is open for school and college students from the country. The competitions usually take place around December–January–February. In the 2014 International Mathematical Olympiad, the Bangladesh team achieved one silver, one bronze and four honorable mentions, placing the country at 53 among 101 participating countries. In the 2015 International Mathematical Olympiad, the Bangladesh team achieved one silver, four bronze and one honorable mention, finishing in 33rd place. Ahmed Zawad Chowdhury, who previously won a silver and a bronze in  2017 and 2016, helped Bangladesh win a gold medal for the first time in the 2018 International Mathematical Olympiad. He had previously missed a gold medal in 2017 by only two marks.

Format
The students are divided into four academic categories:
 Primary: Class 3-5
 Junior: Class 6-8
 Secondary: Class 9-10
 Higher Secondary: Class 11–12

Selection Round
After achieving 1st gold medal in international Mathematics Olympiad in 2018, the competition spread all over the country. The organisers took selection round in 64 districts of Bangladesh in 2019. In 2020, due to the COVID-19 pandemic, this competition held entirely by online platform in 29 February. The selected participant of selection round can attend in regional competition.

Regional Olympiad
The country is divided in 20 
regions for the Regional Olympiad. In each division except Dhaka, nearly 60 students among 1000 participants are selected for the National Olympiad. In Dhaka, the number of participants is more than 3000 and 100–150 are selected for the National Olympiad. In all of the problems in the Regional Olympiad, only the final answers are necessary.

National Olympiad
In the National Olympiad, the top 71 participants are given prizes. The time given for solving the problems depends on the category: 2 hours for the Primary category, 3 hours for the Junior category, and 4 hours for the Secondary and Higher Secondary category.

National Math Camp 
A group for the National Math Camp is selected from the winners of the National Olympiad.

Medal winners in International Mathematical Olympiad 
For every year since 2005, Bangladeshi students have participated in the International Mathematical Olympiad.
Samin Riasat and Nazia Chowdhury won bronze medals for Bangladesh in 2009. Dhananjoy Biswas won the first silver medal for Bangladesh in 2012. Ahmed Zawad Chowdhury brought the first and only (till now) gold medal for Bangladesh in 2018. 

The following is the full list of medal winners from Bangladesh:

References

External links 

 

Education in Bangladesh
2001 establishments in Bangladesh
Mathematics competitions
Science and technology in Bangladesh
Competitions in Bangladesh